Mark Mandy (born 19 November 1972) is a retired Irish high jumper who grew up in England and competed for the Republic of Ireland by virtute of the fact he had a grandfather from Dublin. He seems to have retired from top level competition in 1999.

He competed at the World Championships in 1993, 1995 and 1997, the 1996 Olympic Games, the 1997 World Indoor Championships, the 1994, 1996 and 1998 European Indoor Championships and the 1994 European Championships without reaching the final.

Domestically, Mandy became Irish champion five times as well as AAA champion in 1997, AAA indoor champion in 1997, and Scottish champion in 1995.

His personal best jump is 2.25 metres, achieved in July 1995 in Gateshead. He had 2.26 metres on the indoor track, achieved in February 1997 in Birmingham. His best was the Irish record for a while before Brendan Reilly switched his allegiance from the United Kingdom to the Republic of Ireland and broke the record.

References

1972 births
Living people
Irish male high jumpers
Athletes (track and field) at the 1996 Summer Olympics
Olympic athletes of Ireland